Unstoppable is the sixth studio album by American country music group Rascal Flatts, and their final album to be released with Lyric Street Records. It was released on April 7, 2009 and produced four singles on the US Billboard Hot Country Songs chart. The album debuted at number one on the Billboard 200 in the U.S. with 351,000 copies sold, making it the band's fourth consecutive number-one debut on the chart. It topped the 1 million mark on October 31, 2009. As of June 2010, the album had sold over 1,230,638 copies in the United States. This was the band's final album to top the Billboard 200.

Content
Three tracks were released as digital singles prior to the album's release: "Forever", "Love Who You Love" and "Things That Matter", on March 17, 24, and 31, respectively.

Singles
The first single, "Here Comes Goodbye", was released on January 20, 2009. The song was co-written by American Idol season 6 finalist Chris Sligh. The band toured in support of the album on the Rascal Flatts American Living Unstoppable Tour, presented by department store chain JCPenney. Editions sold at JCPenney included the bonus track "American Living". "Summer Nights" was released as the second single from the album on May 19, 2009. It reached number 2 on the Billboard Hot Country Songs chart. "Why" was released as the third single from the album on September 29, 2009. It became their lowest-peaking career single to date, peaking at number 18 on the aforementioned chart. "'Unstoppable" was released as the album's fourth single on January 4, 2010, and was a Top 10 hit on the Billboard country chart.

Critical reception
The album overall gained mixed reviews. Matt Bjorke of Roughstock gave the album a favorable review. Similar to his later review of the single "Summer Nights,", Bjorke commented that the album would appeal to fans of Rascal Flatts, but would unlikely bring new fans to the group. He specifically cited "Why" as the best track of the album, writing, "This is the kind of song that got me to personally like Rascal Flatts and it's certainly the best track on Unstoppable and "There's gotta be 'Song of the Year' accolades somewhere down the line for this song as it's that powerful."

Track listing

Personnel 

Rascal Flatts
 Jay DeMarcus – bass guitar (all tracks), backing vocals (all tracks)
 Gary Levox – lead vocals (all tracks)
 Joe Don Rooney – electric guitar (all tracks), backing vocals (all tracks), acoustic guitar (2, 5, 6, 8, 9), guitar solos (2-11)

Additional Musicians
 Tim Akers – keyboards (1)
 Charlie Judge – keyboards (1, 3, 7, 11), synthesizers (2, 4, 5, 6, 8, 9, 10), loops (2, 4, 5, 6, 8, 9, 10), lap steel guitar (2, 10), cello (2), acoustic piano (4, 10), electric piano (5), percussion (6, 8), strings (6, 9), Hammond B3 organ (8, 10), string arrangements and conductor (11)
 Gordon Mote – acoustic piano (2, 6, 7, 11)
 Steve Nathan – Hammond B3 organ (5)
 Tom Bukovac – electric guitar (1, 2, 4, 5, 6, 8, 9, 11), acoustic guitar (2, 5, 6, 8, 9)
 Dann Huff – electric guitar (1-5, 7-11), mandolin (1, 3), acoustic guitar (2, 4, 10, 11), banjo (3), dobro (10)
 Ilya Toshinsky – acoustic guitar (1, 2, 3, 6, 7, 10), bouzouki (1), electric guitar (2, 6)
 Adam Shoenfeld – electric guitar (3, 7, 10)
 Paul Franklin – steel guitar (1-4, 6, 7, 8, 11), steel guitar solo (11)
 Dan Dugmore – steel guitar (5, 9, 10)
 Chris McHugh – drums (1-6, 8-11)
 Shannon Forrest – drums (7)
 Eric Darken – percussion (1, 5, 7, 11)
 Jonathan Yudkin – fiddle (1, 6, 8), cello (5), 12-string bass (5), viola (5), violin (5), string arrangements (5), mandolin (7, 11)
 David Campbell – string arrangements and conductor (2)
 Carl Gorodetzky – string contractor (11)
 The London Session Orchestra – strings (2)
 The Nashville String Machine –strings (11)

Production 
 Dann Huff – producer 
 Rascal Flatts – producers
 Kirk Boyer – A&R
 Doug Howard – A&R 
 Darrell Franklin – A&R coordinator 
 Ben Fowler – recording
 Justin Niebank – recording, mixing
 Mark Hagen – overdub recording 
 Drew Bollman – recording assistant, mix assistant 
 Seth Morton – recording assistant, overdub assistant 
 John Netti – recording assistant, mix assistant 
 Taylor Nyquist – overdub assistant 
 Mark Petaccia – recording assistant, overdub assistant 
 Lowell Reynolds – recording assistant, overdub assistant 
 Roy Wallace – overdub assistant 
 Nathan Yarborough – recording assistant, overdub assistant 
 Christopher Rowe – digital editing 
 Adam Ayan – mastering 
 Mike "Frog" Griffith – production coordinator 
 Sherri Halford – art direction 
 Ashley Heron – art direction 
 Glenn Sweitzer – art direction, package design 
 Chris Kubik – cover design 
 Fresh Film + Design – package design
 Leann Mueller – photography
 John Murphy – wardrobe
 Melissa Schleicher – hair, makeup

Studios 
 Recorded at Blackbird Studio (Nashville, TN) and Capitol Studios (Hollywood, CA).
 Overdubbed at Blackbird Studio; River City Studios, Ltd. (Grand Rapids, MI); Smart Studios (Madison, WI); Pogo Studios (Champaign, IL).
 Mixed at Blackbird Studio
 Mastered at Gateway Mastering (Portland , ME).

Chart performance

Weekly charts

Year-end charts

Singles

Certifications

References

2009 albums
Rascal Flatts albums
Albums produced by Dann Huff
Lyric Street Records albums

Albums recorded at Capitol Studios